Zlaté Piesky (literally Golden Sands) is a lake and a summer resort in northeastern Bratislava, Slovakia, near the D1 motorway.

Characteristics
The water area stretches 400 metres, with the depth reaching 30 metres. The lake and surrounding area comprise the largest recreational and sporting region in Bratislava. On its northern shore, there are a major tent camp called Intercamp and several restaurants; a shopping centre is within walking distance.

Visitors can take part in different sports at the resort, such as swimming, volleyball, streetball, mini-golf, tennis and others.

The 1976 tragedy

On 28 July 1976, Zlaté Piesky witnessed one of the most tragic airplane crashes in the history of Czechoslovakia. A Czechoslovak Airlines plane en route from Prague to Bratislava failed to land at the nearby airport and crashed into the lake. Seventy passengers and six crew members died.

Aerial photos and maps

External links
One day at Zlaté Piesky—a photo album 

Geography of Bratislava
Artificial lakes of Slovakia
Tourist attractions in Bratislava